is an original Japanese animated television film written and directed by Kenji Kamiyama, with animation production by Craftar.

It premiered on television on Wowow on January 30, 2022. It was later released in theaters in Japan on March 18, 2022.

Characters

Production and release 

The film was announced on August 3, 2021, to coincide with the 30th anniversary of Wowow. It is written for the screen and directed by Kenji Kamiyama and its animation production is by Craftar. Go Shiina composed the music. The film premiered on Wowow on January 30, 2022. After the television premiere, it was announced that the film would also be released in Japanese theaters on March 18, 2022.

References

External links 

  

 
 

2022 anime films
2022 films
Adventure anime and manga
Anime television films
Crime in anime and manga
Wowow original programming